Brock Granger (born March 10, 1991) is an American soccer player.

Career

College and amateur
Granger began his career at UNLV.  In 2009, he made 18 appearances and helped the Rebels defense to five clean sheets.  Following his freshman year at UNLV, Granger transferred to the University of Louisville along with teammate Nick DeLeon.  In his first season with the Cardinals in 2010, he made 24 appearances and helped the defense register eight clean sheets.  He also recorded four assists.  In 2011, he made 19 appearances and recorded two assists.  In 2012, he made 21 appearances and scored his first collegiate goal on October 27, 2012, in at 1–0 win in the final regular season match against Cincinnati to claim the third BIG East title in school history.

During his time in college, Granger also spent the 2010 and 2012 season with Portland Timbers U23s in the USL Premier Development League.  In 2010, the Timbers U23s capped off a perfect season by winning their first USL PDL title.

Professional
On January 22, 2013, Granger was drafted in the third round (50th overall) of the 2013 MLS Supplemental Draft by Real Salt Lake.  However, he did not sign with the club.

Granger later joined USL Pro club Dayton Dutch Lions and made his debut on April 20, 2013, in a 2–1 win over Pittsburgh Riverhounds.

Granger signed with Arizona United on February 13, 2015. He was released on August 10, 2017.

Honors

Portland Timbers U23s
 USL PDL Champions (1): 2010
 USL PDL Western Conference Champions (1): 2010
 USL PDL Northwest Division Champions (1): 2010

References

External links
 Louisville Cardinals bio

1991 births
Living people
American soccer players
Association football defenders
Dayton Dutch Lions players
Louisville Cardinals men's soccer players
Phoenix Rising FC players
Portland Timbers U23s players
Real Salt Lake draft picks
Soccer players from Honolulu
UNLV Rebels men's soccer players
USL Championship players
USL League Two players